Stephen Lawrence (1974–1993) was a black British victim of a racially motivated attack in London.

Stephen or Steven Lawrence may also refer to:
Stephen Lawrence (footballer) (born 1969), Hawthorn footballer
Stephen J. Lawrence, (1939–2021) American composer
Stephen Lawrence (1974-1993), British murder victim
Steven Anthony Lawrence (born 1990), American child actor
Steven Lawrence (born 1976), Australian footballer

See also
Steve Lawrence (disambiguation)
Stephen Laurence, scientist and philosopher